FC Utrecht Vrouwen was the women's football section of Dutch club FC Utrecht based in Utrecht. Established in 2007, as one of the founding members of the professional Dutch women's football league the team competed in the league from its inaugural season (2007–08) until 2011–12 and the BeNe League (Belgian and Dutch combined league) from 2012–13 until the team's dissolution in January 2014. The club won the Dutch Cup once and the Dutch Super Cup once.Late July 2021 it was reported that FC Utrecht was looking into provisionally restarting a women's team in the Eredivisie Vrouwen in season 2023-24

History
20 March 2007, the Royal Dutch Football Association (KNVB) officially unveiled the professional Dutch women's football league (Eredivisie Vrouwen) for three seasons starting in 2007–08 with FC Utrecht amongst the six clubs taking part.

The club played its first official match on 30 August 2007, a 0–2 home defeat to AZ at the Sportcomplex Zoudenbalch in its opening Eredivisie match of the 2007–08 season. The team had a good season finishing third in the league and runners-up in the KNVB Women's Cup (Dutch Cup), after losing the final 3–0 to FC Twente.

A fourth place finish in the league's 2008–09 season was followed by a fifth place in the next season (2009–10), in that same season the club won the Dutch Cup, on 15 May 2010 by beating Ter Leede 3–0 in the final, and subsequently, on 27 August 2010 defeated 3–1 (after extra time) Eredivisie champion AZ to win the Dutch Super Cup.

On 22 February 2011, during the second half of the 2010–11 season, a meeting between the League (Stichting Eredivisie Vrouwen - SEV), KNVB and clubs was held to discuss possible improvement to the league. A statement from the KNVB announced that from next season matchdays would move from Thursdays to Fridays, relationship changes between clubs and their affiliated amateur clubs, guideline principles amongst other topics discussed and the financial conditions were to be discussed on a further meeting, as the KNVB was trying to keep the league with eight teams next season. On 8 March 2011, FC Utrecht became the third team (after AZ and Willem II) to announce its league withdraw from next season due to financial reasons. At the end of the 2010–11 season, the club finished fifth in the league. On 3 May 2011, the SEV and KNVB confirmed FC Utrecht as one of the six participants of the Eredivisie 2011–12 season, where the team finished fourth.

In 2012 the professional women's leagues of Belgium and the Netherlands merged creating the 16 teams BeNe League, FC Utrecht was one of the eight Dutch teams who participated of its inaugural 2012–13 season. The team finished the season in 12th place.

In June 2013, despite financial concerns the team applied for a license to play the 2013–14 BeNe League season.
 By the end of October, the Utrecht Women's Football Foundation (SVVU) which ran the club, no longer able to meet its financial obligations started to analyse the possibilities of continuing even in an amateur basis.

On 10 January 2014, the SVVU filed for bankruptcy at the district court of Utrecht. On 21 January 2014, the district court of Utrecht ruled SVVU as bankrupt providing a legal eight days period to appeal the court's decision. During the eight days period, the team had to meet its competition obligations which included an away match against Club Brugge on 24 January. FC Utrecht won the match 2–1, it was the team's last official match. After the eight days appeal period expired, the SVVU was legally dissolved from 30 January 2014 at 0:00 CET, having played 16 matches and in eleventh position in the standings, the team was removed from the BeNe League and had all its 2013–14 season (BeNe League and Dutch Cup) results revoked and fixtures cancelled.

Affiliated clubs
Professional women's football clubs in the Netherlands are required by the Royal Dutch Football Association to affiliate an amateur club who would use players coming back from injury or reserve players or young talented players from the professional club. FC Utrecht chose SV Saestum as its associated club.

Competitive record

* Note: Withdrew due to bankruptcy before the conclusion of the season in January 2014, all results and fixtures were cancelled.

Honours
 Dutch Cup
 Winners (1): 2010
 Dutch Super Cup
 Winners (1): 2010

Players

Latest squad
The club's last professional squad which competed at the 2013–14 BeNe League.

Former players

Internationals
 : Angela Christ, Petra Hogewoning, Anouk Hoogendijk, Myrthe Moorrees, Tessa Oudejans, Mandy Versteegt, Miranda Verrips

Head coaches
  Maria van Kortenhof (2007–2009)
  Mark Verkuijl (2009–2012)
  Jürgen Schefczyk (2012–2014)

References

Women
Women's football clubs in the Netherlands
BeNe League teams
Eredivisie (women) teams
2007 establishments in the Netherlands
Association football clubs established in 2007
Association football clubs disestablished in 2014
2014 disestablishments in the Netherlands
Football clubs in Utrecht (city)